Arzu is a feminine Turkish given name, it may refer to:

People
 Arzu (footballer) (born 1981), Spanish footballer 
 Arzu Ceylan, Turkish taekwondo former practitioner
 Arzu Ece (born 1963), Turkish singer
 Arzu Göllü (born 1969), Turkish volleyball player
 Arzu Karabulut (born 1991), Turkish-German football player
 Arzu Özyiğit (born 1972), Turkish basketball player
 Arzu Rahimov (born 1964), Azerbaijani politician
 Arzu Rana Deuba (born 1962), Nepalese politician and social worker
 Arzu Sema Canbul (born 1973), Turkish footballer
 Arzu Tan (born 1973), Turkish taekwondo former practitioner and coach
 Arzu Toker (born 1952), Turkish-German writer
 Arzu Yanardağ (born 1977), Turkish actress and model
 Siraj-ud-Din Ali Khan Arzu (1687–1756), Delhi-based poet

See also
 Arzu (disambiguation)

Turkish feminine given names